The Roman Catholic Diocese of Tiruchirapalli/Trichy is a diocese located in the city of Tiruchirapalli in the Ecclesiastical province of Madurai in India.

History
 1606: Established as Mission “sui iuris” of Madura from the Diocese of Cochin
 1773: Suppressed
 1836: Restored as the Apostolic Vicariate of Madura and Coromandel Coast from the Diocese of São Tomé of Meliapore
 1 September 1886: Promoted as Diocese of Madurai
 7 June 1887: Renamed as Diocese of Trichinopoly
 21 October 1950: Renamed as Diocese of Tiruchirapalli

Special churches
Basilica of the Holy Redeemer, Tiruchirapalli, a minor basilica

Leadership

 Bishops of Tiruchirapalli 
 Savarimuthu Arokiaraj (15 August 2021 - Incumbent)
 Apostolic Administrator of Tiruchirapalli - Devadass Ambrose Mariadoss (14 July 2018 - 15 August 2021)
 Antony Devotta (16 November 2000 – 14 July 2018)
 Gabriel Lawrence Sengol (6 October 1990 – 14 October 1997)
 Thomas Fernando (November 33, 1970 – 6 October 1990)
 James Mendonça (7 March 1938– 19 December 1970)
 John Peter Leonard, S.J. (later Archbishop) (2 January 1936 – 8 January 1938)
 Ange-Auguste Faisandier, S.J. (19 December 1913 – 24 September 1934)
 Jean-Marie Barthe, S.J. (21 March 1890 – 19 December 1913)
 Alexis Canoz, S.J. (7 June 1887 – 2 December 1888)
 Bishops of Madurai 
 Alexis Canoz, S.J. (1 September 1886 – 7 June 1887)
 Vicars Apostolic of Madura and Coromandel Coast
 Alexis Canoz, S.J. (25 April 1846 – 1 September 1886)
 Clément Bonnand, M.E.P. (3 October 1836 – 3 April 1850)
 Louis-Charles-Auguste Hébert, M.E.P. (8 July 1836 – 3 October 1836)

Saints and causes for canonisation
 Servant of God Annammal Selvanayagam Pillai
 Servant of God Rev. Fr. Antony Soosainather

References

External links
 GCatholic.org
 Catholic Hierarchy

Roman Catholic dioceses in India
Religious organizations established in the 1600s
1606 establishments in India
Roman Catholic dioceses and prelatures established in the 17th century
Christianity in Tamil Nadu